Vinni is a small borough in Vinni Parish, Lääne-Viru County, in northern Estonia. Vinni had a population of 955 on 1 January 2012.

The last battle on the Estonian soil during the Great Northern War took place on the field of Vinni on 15 August 1708. This resulted in the withdrawal of the remaining Swedish forces to Reval (Tallinn) and Pernau (Pärnu).

References

Boroughs and small boroughs in Estonia